Julie Mehretu (born November 28, 1970) is an Ethiopian American contemporary visual artist, known for her multi-layered paintings of abstracted landscapes on a large scale. Her paintings, drawings, and prints depict the cumulative effects of urban sociopolitical changes.

Mehretu is included in Times 100 Most Influential People of 2020.

Early life and education
Mehretu was born in Addis Ababa, Ethiopia in 1970, the first child of an Ethiopian college professor of geography and a Jewish American Montessori teacher. They fled the country in 1977 to escape political turmoil and moved to East Lansing, Michigan, for her father's teaching position in economic geography at Michigan State University. A graduate of East Lansing High School, Mehretu received a Bachelor of Arts degree from Kalamazoo College in Kalamazoo, Michigan, and did a junior year abroad at Cheikh Anta Diop University (UCAD) in Dakar, Senegal, then attended the Rhode Island School of Design in Providence, Rhode Island, where she earned a Master of Fine Arts degree in 1997. Mehretu shares her studio with her partner, artist Jessica Rankin. Her mother-in-law is author and poet Lily Brett.

Art career

Mehretu's canvases incorporate elements from technical drawings of various urban buildings and linear illustrations of urban efficiency, including city grids and weather charts. The pieces do not contain any formal, consistent sense of depth, instead of utilizing multiple points of view and perspective ratios to construct flattened re-imaginings of city life. Her drawings are similar to her paintings, with many layers forming complex, abstracted images of social interaction on a global scale. The relatively smaller-scale drawings are opportunities for exploration made during the time between paintings.

Emperial Construction, Istanbul (2004) exemplifies Mehretu's use of layers in a city's history. Arabic lettering and forms that reference Arabic script scatter around the canvas. In Stadia I, II, and III (2004) Mehretu conveys the cultural importance of the stadium through marks and layers of flat shape. Each Stadia contains an architectural outline of a stadium, abstracted flags of the world, and references to corporate logos.
Mogamma: A Painting in Four Parts (2012), the collective name for four monumental canvases that were included in dOCUMENTA (13), relates to 'Al-Mogamma', the name of the all purpose government building in Tahrir Square, Cairo which was both instrumental in the 2011 revolution and architecturally symptomatic of Egypt's post-colonial past. The word 'Mogamma', however, means 'collective' in Arabic and historically, has been used to refer to a place that shares a mosque, a synagogue and a church and is a place of multi faith. A later work, The Round City, Hatshepsut (2013) contains architectural traces of Baghdad, Iraq itself – its title referring to the historical name given to the city in ancient maps. Another painting, Insile (2013) built up from a photo image of Believers' Palace amid civilian buildings, activates its surface with painterly ink gestures, blurring and effacing the ruins beneath.

While best known for large-scale abstract paintings, Mehretu has experimented with prints since graduate school at the Rhode Island School of Design, where she was enrolled in the painting and printmaking program in the mid-1990s. Her exploration of printmaking began with etching. She has completed collaborative projects at professional printmaking studios across America, among them Highpoint Editions in Minneapolis, Crown Point Press in San Francisco, Gemini G.E.L. in Los Angeles, and Derrière L'Etoile Studios and Burnet Editions in New York City.

Mehretu was a resident of the CORE Program, Glassell School of Art, Museum of Fine Arts, Houston (1997–98) and the Artist-in-Residence Program at the Studio Museum in Harlem (2001). During a residency at the Walker Art Center, Minneapolis, in 2003, she worked with thirty high school girls from East Africa. In 2007, she led a monthlong residency program with 40 art students from Detroit public high schools. In the spring of 2007 she was the Guna S. Mundheim Visual Arts Fellow at the American Academy in Berlin.

During her residency in Berlin, Mehretu was commissioned to create seven paintings by the Deutsche Guggenheim; titled Grey Area (2008–2009), the series explores the urban landscape of Berlin as a historical site of generation and destruction. The painting Vanescere (2007), a black-and-white composition that depicts what appears to be a maelstrom of ink and acrylic marks, some of which are sanded away on the surface of the linen support, propelled a layering process of subtraction in the Grey Area series. Parts of Fragment (2008–09) and Middle Grey (2007–09) feature this erasing technique. Another in the series that was painted in Berlin, Berliner Plätze (2008–09), holds a phantom presence of overlapped outlines of nineteenth-century German buildings that float as a translucent mass in the frame. The art historian Sue Scott has this to say of the Grey Area series: "In these somber, simplified tonal paintings, many of which were based on the facades of beautiful nineteenth-century buildings destroyed in World War II, one gets the sense of buildings in the process of disappearing, much like the history of the city she was depicting." As Mehretu explains in Ocula Magazine, 'The whole idea of 20th-century progress and ideas of futurity and modernity have been shattered, in a way. All of this is what is informing how I am trying to think about space.'

Other activities 
 Americans for the Arts, Member of the Artists Committee

Recognition 

In 2000, Mehretu was awarded a grant from the Foundation for Contemporary Arts Grants to Artists Award. She was the recipient of the 2001 Penny McCall Award. On September 20, 2005, she was named as one of the 2005 recipients of the MacArthur Fellowship, often referred to as the "genius grant."

In 2007, while completing a residency at the American Academy in Berlin, Julie Mehretu received the 15th commission of the Deutsche Bank and Solomon R. Guggenheim Foundation. The body of work she created, Grey Area, was composed of six large-scale paintings, completed between 2007 and 2009 in a studio in Berlin.

In 2013, Mehretu was awarded the Barnett and Annalee Newman Award and in 2015 Mehretu received the US Department of State Medal of Arts from Secretary of State John Kerry.

In 2020, Time magazine included Mehretu in its list of the 100 most influential people.

Notable works in public collections 

Blue Field (1997), Museum of Fine Arts, Houston
Babel Unleashed (2001), Walker Art Center, Minneapolis
Retopistics: A Renegade Excavation (2001), Crystal Bridges Museum of American Art, Bentonville, Arkansas
Empirical Construction, Istanbul (2003), Museum of Modern Art, New York
Entropia (review) (2004), Brooklyn Museum, New York
Stadia I (2004), San Francisco Museum of Modern Art
Stadia II (2004), Carnegie Museum of Art, Pittsburgh
Stadia III (2004), Virginia Museum of Fine Arts, Richmond
Local Calm (2005), San Diego Museum of Art
Atlantic Wall (2008-2009), Solomon R. Guggenheim Museum, New York
Auguries (2010), The Broad, Los Angeles and National Museum of African Art, Smithsonian Institution, Washington, D.C.
Untitled (2011), Studio Museum in Harlem, New York
Mogamma, A Painting in Four Parts: Part 3 (2012), Tate, London
Mogamma, A Painting in Four Parts: Part 4 (2012), Museum of Fine Arts, Houston
Cairo (2013), The Broad, Los Angeles
Invisible Sun (algorithm 5, second letter form) (2014), Museum of Modern Art, New York
Myriads, Only by Dark (2014), National Gallery of Art, Washington, D.C.
A Love Supreme (2014-2018), Art Institute of Chicago
Hineni (E. 3:4) (Me voici) (2018), Centre Pompidou, Paris
Haka (and Riot) (2019), Los Angeles County Museum of Art
Conversion (S.M. del Popolo/after C.) (2019-2020), Metropolitan Museum of Art, New York

In 2016, the San Francisco Museum of Modern Art commissioned Mehretu to create a diptych, with each massive painting flanking the staircase in the atrium which is accessible and free to the public. HOWL, eon (I, II) (2016-2017) was first exhibited to the public on September 2, 2017. To facilitate the creation of the scale of the diptych, Mehretu used a decommissioned church in Harlem as her studio to create. Throughout the creation of her piece, she collaborated with jazz pianist Jason Moran. HOWL, eon (I, II) is a political commentary on the history of the western United States' landscape, including the San Francisco Bay Area. The foundation of each work contains digitally abstracted photos from recent race riots, street protests, and nineteenth-century images of the American west.

Exhibitions
In 2001, Mehretu participated in the exhibition Painting at the Edge of the World at the Walker Art Center. She later was one of 38 artists whose work was exhibited in the 2004-5 Carnegie International: A Final Look. She has participated in numerous group exhibitions, including one at the Center for Curatorial Studies, Bard College, Annandale-on-Hudson (2000). Her work has appeared in Freestyle exhibition at the Studio Museum in Harlem (2001); The Americans at the Barbican Gallery in London (2001); White Cube gallery in London (2002), the Busan Biennale in Korea (2002); the 8th Baltic Triennial in Vilnius, Lithuania (2002); and Drawing Now: Eight Propositions (2002) at the Museum of Modern Art in New York. Mehretu's work was also included in the "In Praise of Doubt" exhibition at the Palazzo Grassi in Venice in the summer of 2011 as well as dOCUMENTA (13) in Kassel in 2012. In 2014, she participated in 'The Divine Comedy. Heaven, Purgatory and Hell Revisited by Contemporary African Artists' curated by Simon Njami.

Art market
Mehretu's painting Untitled 1 sold for $1.02 million at Sotheby's in September 2010. Its estimated value had been $600–$800,000. At Art Basel in 2014, White Cube sold Mehretu's Mumbo Jumbo (2008) for $5 million.

In 2005, Mehretu's work was the object of the Lehmann v. The Project Worldwide case before the New York Supreme Court, the first case brought by a collector regarding their right to secure primary access to contemporary art. The case involved legal issues over her work and the right of first refusal contracts between her then-gallery and a collector. In return for a $75,000 loan by the collector Jean-Pierre Lehmann to the Project Gallery, made in February 2001, the gallery was to give Lehmann a right of first refusal on any work by any artist the gallery represented, and at a 30 per cent discount until the loan was repaid. Lehmann saw this loan as direct access to Mehretu's work, however, there were four other individuals who were also given right of first choice from the gallery's represented artists. The gallery sold 40 works by Mehretu during the period of the contract, with some offered for discounts of up to 40 percent. Lehmann saw that several Mehretu pieces available in the catalog of the Walker Art Center had been sold to collector Jeanne Greenberg Rohatyn, and  suspected that the agreement was not being kept. He subsequently wrote Haye demanding $17,500, and, after no offer of Mehretu pieces was made, he filed suit. The case, eventually won by Lehmann, revealed to a wider public precisely what prices and discounts galleries offer various collectors on paintings by Mehretu and other contemporary artists - information normally concealed by the art world.

References

Further reading

External links

 Website of her gallery carlier | gebauer including CV and works
Julie Mehretu at Highpoint Center for Printmaking, Minneapolis
Julie Mehretu at Walker Art Center, Minneapolis
Julie Mehretu interviewed for Ethiopian Passages
2010 article including an image of Untitled 1

American contemporary painters
Ethiopian painters
American abstract artists
Ethiopian emigrants to the United States
MacArthur Fellows
People from East Lansing, Michigan
Kalamazoo College alumni
Rhode Island School of Design alumni
1970 births
Living people
American women painters
American women printmakers
Ethiopian LGBT artists
LGBT people from Michigan
LGBT people from New York (state)
20th-century American painters
20th-century American women artists
20th-century American printmakers
21st-century American women artists
Members of the American Academy of Arts and Letters
American lesbian artists